The University of Maryland (UMD) Center for Advanced Study of Language (CASL)—which in 2018 became part of UMD's new Applied Research Laboratory for Intelligence and Security (ARLIS)—was created to be the national laboratory for advanced research and development on language and national security. Founded in 2003 under Department of Defense funding as a University Affiliated Research Center (UARC) and located in College Park, Maryland, CASL was a partnership between the University of Maryland and the United States Government. In June 2013 CASL was said to be the largest language research center in the United States.

CASL areas of expertise:
Second-language acquisition (SLA)
Technology use
Performance and analysis
Less commonly taught languages and cultures
Cognitive neuroscience

CASL's mission was to defend and protect the United States by improving language readiness and capabilities of the U.S. Government workforce, with a particular focus on addressing the language needs of the Intelligence Community (IC).

The Center was charged with bringing the best of academe and industry to the hardest government problems; providing the knowledge, resources, and technologies critical to analyst job performance; advancing workforce readiness for both regular and surge capabilities; improving operational performance; and underpinning critical leadership decisions on immediate and future staffing, technologies, and analyst workflow design and management.

Vision
CASL's vision was to be the premier strategic research partner to the DoD and IC on the most critical and challenging language problems, ultimately infusing language research into day-to-day job performance as well as critical leadership decisions that directly affect mission.

Strategy
 Conduct independent, empirically based science guided by the strategic needs of the DoD and IC, coupled with an agility when solving the toughest current operational language problems.
 Capitalize on the extraordinary talents of a permanent staff of nationally recognized, multidisciplinary research scientists and former and current DoD and IC outstanding practitioners, supported by a stronghold of language experts from academe and business in the United States and around the world.
 Collaborate with DoD and IC thought-leaders, managers, and analysts to successfully transition rigorous research into the operational environment and assess its impact.

Other news
According to press reports, Edward Snowden worked at the CASL for less than a year in 2005 as a "security specialist" in what one report calls one of the National Security Agency (NSA)'s "covert facilities."

See also
 Defense Language Institute

References

External links
 University of Maryland Center for Advanced Study of Language Home page

University System of Maryland
Educational institutions established in 2003
Academic language institutions
National Security Agency
2003 establishments in Maryland